Argumental is a Dave comedy panel game television show that was first broadcast between 2008 and 2011. It was created by Ricky Kelehar, and was hosted by John Sergeant until the end of Series 3 after which Sean Lock took over for the fourth series. In each episode two teams of two panelists, a blue team and a red team, debated and argued on various topics, with the studio audience voting for who they thought put forward the best case. For the first three series the blue team was captained by Rufus Hound while the red team was captained by Marcus Brigstocke, for the fourth series the captains were Robert Webb (blue) and Seann Walsh (red).

In total 49 episodes were broadcast, 44 regular editions and five clip shows. A Comic Relief special was broadcast as part of the 24 Hour Panel People marathon with David Walliams as host, but this does not count to the official number of episodes. All 49 official episodes were first broadcast on UKTV channel Dave, with four episodes from the second series additionally being shown on BBC Two.

Episode list
The coloured backgrounds denote the result of each of the shows:
 – indicates the blue team (Rufus/Robert) won
 – indicates the red team (Marcus/Seann) won
 – indicates the game ended in a draw

Series 1

Series 2

Series 3

Comic Relief special

Series 4

Scores

Notes

External links

Lists of British comedy television series episodes
Lists of British non-fiction television series episodes